Jundiá is a municipality located in the Brazilian state of Alagoas. Its population is 4,137 (2020) and its area is 120 km².

References

Municipalities in Alagoas